Montenars is a comune (municipality) in the Province of Udine in the Italian region Friuli-Venezia Giulia, located about  northwest of Trieste and about  north of Udine.

Montenars borders the following municipalities: Artegna, Gemona del Friuli, Lusevera, Magnano in Riviera, Tarcento.

Demographic evolution

Twin towns
Montenars is twinned with:

  Arezzo, Italy, since 1977

References

Cities and towns in Friuli-Venezia Giulia